The Depot Museum in Avon Park, Florida in Highlands County, Florida is a railroad museum housed in a historic 1926 railroad depot. It is operated by the Historical Society of Avon Park. A dining car is exhibited. The depot was along the Seaboard Airline Railroad, serving the Palmland, Silver Meteor, Silver Star and Sunland trains.

References

Website
Avon Park Historical Society website

Museums in Highlands County, Florida
Railroad museums in Florida
Historical society museums in Florida
Avon Park, Florida
1926 establishments in Florida